Kalenica is a mountain in the Owl Mountains, part of Central Sudetes. Its height is 964 meters. It lies in Owl Mountains Landscape Park.

The mountain located in Dzierżoniów County, Lower Silesian Voivodeship, in south-western Poland.

External links
 Photo gallery of Kalenica 

Mountains of Poland